John o' Groats is a village 2.5 mi (4 km) northeast of Canisbay, Caithness, in the far north of Scotland.

In summer, a ferry operates between John o' Groats and Burwick on South Ronaldsay in Orkney.

Name
The settlement takes its name from Jan de Groot, a 15th-century Dutchman who once plied a ferry from the Scottish mainland to Orkney, which had recently been acquired from Norway by King James IV. Local legend has that the "o' Groats" refers to John's charge of one groat for use of his ferry, but it actually derives from the Dutch de groot, meaning "the large". People from John o' Groats are known as "Groaters".

The name John o' Groats has a particular resonance because it is often used as a starting or ending point for cycles, walks, and charitable events to and from Land's End (at the extreme south-western tip of the Cornish peninsula in England). The phrase Land's End to John o' Groats is frequently heard both as a literal journey (being the longest possible in Great Britain) and as a metaphor for great or all-encompassing distance, similar to the phrase common in the American continents, "coast to coast". Also, for many years, it was the northern terminal of the A9 trunk road, which now ends at Scrabster.

Demography
In 2007, the population of John o' Groats was about 300. The village is dispersed, but has a linear centre with council housing, sports park, and a shop, which is on the main road from the nearest town of Wick.

Tourism
John o' Groats attracts large numbers of tourists from all across the world all year round. In 2005, a popular tourist guide, Lonely Planet, described the village as a "seedy tourist trap" and in 2010, John o' Groats received a Carbuncle Award from Urban Realm magazine for being "Scotland's most dismal town". The completion of major redevelopment work in 2013 aimed to revitalise the area. Every July (usually the second weekend) has the annual Wildcat Motorcycle Rally held at the local village hall, which is run by a local club of motorcycle enthusiasts called TEAM MCC (The End And More Motorcycle Club).

John o' Groats lies at the end of the 14th stage of the John o' Groats Trail, a long-distance walking trail from Inverness to John o' Groats.

Transport
John o' Groats has public transport in the form of buses run by Stagecoach to the nearby towns of Wick and Thurso.

Hotel

The John o' Groats House Hotel was built on or near the site of Jan de Groot's house, and was established in 1875. It has been described by Highlands and Islands Labour MSP Rhoda Grant as "one of the UK's most famous landmarks". It was closed for several years, and fell into disrepair until undergoing a radical transformation by Edinburgh-based architects GLM for self-catering holiday specialists Natural Retreats.  It reopened for business in August 2013.

John o' Groat's House was an ancient house believed to be situated in front of the present hotel and was marked with a flagpole now removed, deriving its name from John of Groat, or Groot, and his brothers, originally from Holland, said to have settled here about 1489. The house was of an octagon shape, being one room, with eight windows and eight doors, to admit eight members of the family; the heads of different branches of it, to prevent their quarrels for precedence at table.  Each came in by this contrivance at his own door, and sat at an octagon table, at which, of course, there was no chief place or head.
—Haydn's Dictionary of Dates

Signpost

The landmark "Journey's End" signpost at John o' Groats was installed in 1964 on private land and operated as a visitor attraction by a Penzance-based photography company that also operates its counterpart at Land's End. Visitors paid a fee for a photograph of themselves next to the signpost displaying either a message or the date and distance to a location of their choice.

When the hotel reopened, a publicly accessible signpost was erected at the original site, without customisable text.

Sport
John o' Groats FC plays in the Caithness Amateur Football Association.

Book festival
The John O'Groat Book Festival was held for the first time in 2018. Since then, it has attracted authors such as Theresa Breslin and Christopher Brookmyre, as well as a number of local authors.
The festival is held annually in April.

See also
Land's End to John o' Groats
Europa Point

References

External links

Official website
John o' Groats, Britannica Online Encyclopedia

Populated places in Caithness
Tourist attractions in Highland (council area)